Nugent Sound is a sound on the Central coast of British Columbia, Canada. It is located between Seymour Inlet to the west and Belize Inlet to the east.

References

Central Coast of British Columbia
Sounds of British Columbia